Muffinbuccinum is a genus of sea snails, marine gastropod mollusks in the family Buccinulidae.

Species
Species within the genus Muffinbuccinum include:

 Muffinbuccinum catherinae Harasewych & Kantor, 2004

References

Buccinulidae
Monotypic gastropod genera